James Oren Browning (born April 6, 1956) is an American attorney serving as a United States district judge of the United States District Court for the District of New Mexico.

Early life and education

Browning was born in Levelland, Texas, and grew up in Hobbs, New Mexico. He received a Bachelor of Arts degree in political science from Yale University in 1978, graduating magna cum laude. While at Yale, Browning played varsity football. He then earned a Juris Doctor from the University of Virginia Law School in 1981. In law school, he was Editor in Chief of the Virginia Law Review. He is a member of the Raven Society and the Order of the Coif.

Career 
After law school, Browning served as a law clerk for Judge Collins J. Seitz on the United States Court of Appeals for the Third Circuit from 1981 to 1982 and then clerked for Justice Lewis F. Powell Jr. of the Supreme Court of the United States from 1982 to 1983. After finishing his judicial clerkships, Browning returned to New Mexico and began working at the law firm Rodey, Dickason, Sloan, Akin, & Robb. He was a deputy attorney general of the New Mexico Department of Justice from 1987 to 1988. Afterward, he returned to private practice at Rodey, Dickason, Sloan, Akin, & Robb. In 1990, he formed his own law firm, Browning & Peifier, P.A. He continued to practice at Browning & Peifer until his appointment to the federal bench in 2003.

Federal judicial service 

Browing was nominated by President George W. Bush on April 28, 2003, to be a United States District Judge of the United States District Court for the District of New Mexico, to a seat vacated by Curtis LeRoy Hansen. He was confirmed by the United States Senate on July 31, 2003, and received commission on August 1, 2003.

See also 
 List of law clerks of the Supreme Court of the United States (Seat 1)

References

External links

1956 births
Judges of the United States District Court for the District of New Mexico
Law clerks of the Supreme Court of the United States
Living people
United States district court judges appointed by George W. Bush
21st-century American judges
People from Levelland, Texas
Yale University alumni
University of Virginia School of Law alumni